Robert Brown Potter (July 16, 1829 – February 19, 1887) was a United States lawyer and a Union Army general in the American Civil War.

Early life
Potter was born in Schenectady, New York on July 16, 1829.  He was the third son of Alonzo Potter, the bishop of the Episcopal Church of Pennsylvania, and Sarah Maria (née Nott) Potter.  His mother was the only daughter of Eliphalet Nott, President of Union College.  After the death of his mother in 1839, his father remarried, in 1840, to his mother's cousin, Sarah Benedict, with whom his mother had placed the children in the event of her death.   Sarah also predeceased Bishop Potter and three months before his death in 1865, he remarried to Frances Seton, who lived in Flushing until her death in 1909.

Potter had eight brothers and a sister, including Clarkson Nott Potter, a Democratic member of the U.S. House of Representatives;
Howard Potter, an attorney and banker; Edward Tuckerman Potter, an architect who designed the Nott Memorial at Union College; Henry Codman Potter, who succeeded Horatio Potter as Bishop of New York in 1887; Eliphalet Nott Potter, an Episcopal priest and president of Hobart College; Maria Louisa Thompson, the wife of sculptor Launt Thompson; James Neilson Potter, a businessman; William Appleton Potter, an architect who designed the Church of the Presidents in Elberon, New Jersey, and Frank Hunter Potter, a journalist who was the choirmaster of the Cathedral of St. John the Divine.

Career
Potter served as an attorney in New York City prior to the outbreak of the Civil War.

Military career
At the start of the Civil War, Potter enlisted as a private in the New York militia, was promoted to lieutenant, and then commissioned as a major on October 14, 1861. He was promoted to lieutenant colonel on November 1 of that year. He was wounded at the Battle of New Bern on March 14, 1862, while serving under Brig. Gen. Ambrose E. Burnside. Potter commanded the 51st New York Volunteer Infantry in IX Corps at Second Bull Run. Promoted to the rank of colonel on September 10, he led the regiment at the Battle of Antietam. Potter was wounded at Antietam while participating in Burnside's attack on the Confederate right flank.

Potter was promoted to the rank of brigadier general on March 13, 1863. He led 2nd Division, IX Corps, in the Siege of Vicksburg. He next commanded IX Corps in the Knoxville Campaign. After serving on recruiting duty in New York state, he was assigned in 1864 command of the 2nd Division of IX Corps under Burnside. Potter led the division in the Overland Campaign and at the Siege of Petersburg. He was wounded in an assault on the Confederate works following the Battle of Fort Stedman, and he missed the closing campaigns of the war.

Upon his recovery he was given command of the Rhode Island and Connecticut district of the Department of the East. On his wedding day was given his commission as full major general of volunteers.

He was honorably mustered out of the volunteer service, January 15, 1866.

Later career
After his retirement from the military, he served for three years as receiver of the Atlantic and Great Western Railroad. He moved to England in 1869, but returned to Rhode Island in 1873, where he died in 1887.

Personal life
On September 20, 1865, General Potter was married to Abigail Austin "Abby" Stevens (1836–1913).  Abby was a daughter of prominent banker John Austin Stevens.

Potter died in Newport, Rhode Island on February 19, 1887.  He was buried at Woodlawn Cemetery in the Bronx, New York City.

References

External links

 

1829 births
1887 deaths
Union Army generals
People of New York (state) in the American Civil War